Güroymak District is a district of Bitlis Province of Turkey. Its seat is the town of Güroymak. Its area is 515 km2, and its population is 48,536 (2021).

Composition
There are three municipalities in Güroymak District:
 Gölbaşı
 Günkırı
 Güroymak

There are 26 villages in Güroymak District:

 Arpacık
 Aşağıkolbaşı
 Budaklı
 Cevizyatağı
 Çallı
 Çayarası
 Çıtak
 Değirmenköy
 Gedikpınar
 Güzelli
 Kaleli
 Kavunlu
 Kekliktepe
 Kuştaşı
 Oduncular
 Özkavak
 Saklı
 Sütderesi
 Tahtalı
 Taşüstü
 Üzümveren
 Yamaçköy
 Yayladere
 Yazıkonak
 Yemişveren
 Yukarıkolbaşı

References

Districts of Bitlis Province